Titans Mobile is an online war-strategy game developed by Chinese studio Something Big Technology Company Limited for the IOS and Android operating systems. It was released on August 25, 2012. In the game, players need to choose their faction from Athens, Crete, Sparta and Troy before they can recruit Greek Myth heroes from each faction and train Infantries, Cavalries, Warships and Sieges to start battles with other players. Result of battles is decided according to abilities of players, abilities of their recruited heroes, and amount and level of their units. In order to level up and gain rewards, players also do quests and everyday tasks. Players can also duel with each other with three of their recruited heroes.

Gameplay
At the beginning of Titans Mobile, the five ancient gods who created the world awoke found humans had forgotten them and worshiped the gods of Olympus instead. These angry gods decided the world should suffer for such betrayal; the ground cracked, mountains collapsed and the sun stopped to rise. Fear and hatred ruled the mankind, and the world was deep in chaos. The gods of Olympus rose and fought back. Battles after battles, Zeus, the king of Olympus finally managed to seal the five ancient gods with himself. He and the five together fell into sleep forever. Zeus sealed the power of the five ancient gods in six precious gems, and 'Player's' purpose is to collect six gems so that he/she will be the chosen one to end the chaos and become the ruler of Greece. After this introduction and tutorial, to collect six gems, players do quests, everyday tasks, battles and duels against players of different factions, and buy Legacy of Gaia in the Temple.

Quest
Ten chapters of quests require players to complete for three times. Each quest has different requirement of units, number of allies, and AP. After one chapter of quests are finished for three times, one hidden quest will show. After all chapters of quests are finished, player can summon one god and recruit this god as his/her hero.

Buildings
There are four kinds of buildings: gold, food, action and defense. The more players have constructed, the more each building costs, which therefore requires players' meticulous arrangement with strategy.

Abilities
When enough experience is accumulated though quests or wars, the player gains a level with three ability points to be assigned on improve their ATK, DEF, AP, or Power. Also when a player completes one chapter of quests, he/she gets 1/2/3 ability points for 1/2/3 times.

War

Battle
Players can battle with others, and result of battles is decided according to abilities of players, abilities of their recruited heroes, and amount and level of their units. Players can loot gold, food from other players if attacking successfully. Each attack consumes 1 Power, and both sides of the battle may lose health or troops. Players gain EXP if winning in either attacking or defending.
During a battle, the system will automatically choose players' most powerful units to attack or defend. The number of player's allies determines the max number of units he/she can send into a battle. Each ally can add six units to a battle, however the max number of units the player can send does not exceed five times of his/her own level.

Sanction
Players can sanction other players with some gold. If one player is sanctioned, he/she can be attacked by all the players. He who kills the sanctioned player gets the gold.

Duel
Player can send three of his/her recruited heroes to duel with other player for three rounds. If a player wins 2 out of 3 rounds, he/she gain 250,000 gold; if a player win 3 out of 3 rounds, he/she gain 350,000 gold. The result of each round is decided according to the hero's Strength (STR): affect the power of attack and chance of striking first in each turn, Intelligence (INT): affect the chance of dodge, and Charisma (CHA): affect the chance of deadly blow.

Rank
There are six leaderboards in the Rank: Battle, Defense, Loot, Duel, Bounty Hunter, and Head price. The leaderboards refresh every day at UTC 02:00 and show the ranks of the last day (0:00 - 24:00); refresh every Monday at UTC 02:00 and show the ranks of the last week (Monday 0:00 to Sunday 24:00). Each player that ranks top 20 will get a trophy accordingly.

Development
The game was available for the App Store (iOS) and Google Play on August 25, 2012.

References

External links
 Something Big Technology Company Limited
 Official website of Titans Mobile

2012 video games
Android (operating system) games
IOS games
Massively multiplayer online real-time strategy games
Video games developed in China